The Autorité régionale de transport métropolitain (ARTM) is responsible for all park and ride lots in Montreal and its surrounding area. It operates 61 lots, many that are adjacent to metropolitan bus terminals, commuter rail stations, or rapid transit stations.

In 2012, over 60% of all ARTM park and ride lots for cars had an usage rate over 75%, with 1 in 5 being used over 90%.

The following are the specific ARTM park and ride lots in Montreal and its surrounding area.

Bus

Metro
STM Montreal Metro stations with park and ride lots:

Commuter rail
Exo commuter train stations with park and ride lots:

Notes

Carpooling

The ARTM also offers 433 spaces specially reserved for carpooling in its park and ride lots.
In operation since 2005, the ARTM Carpool program helps to relieve the demand for parking by reserving seats for customers who carpool in the majority of the park and ride lots.

In addition to the reserved carpool spaces, many park and ride lots also include a number of specific drop-off spaces, nearest to the point of transfer to other modes of transportation (bus, metro, train.)

References 

Exo (public transit)
Parking facilities